Crocus sieberi, Sieber's crocus, also referred to as the Cretan crocus or snow crocus (as is Crocus chrysanthus), is a plant of the genus Crocus in the family Iridaceae. A small, early blooming crocus, it easily naturalises, and is marked by a brilliant orange which is mostly confined to the stamens and style, fading through the bottom third of the tepal. It grows wild generally in the Balkans and Greece, especially in the island Crete. There are four subtypes: sieberi (Crete), atticus (Attica area around Athens), nivalis and sublimis. Its cultivars are used as ornamental plants. Height: .

Subspecies
There are four subspecies of C. sieberi.

 Crocus sieberi subsp. sieberi - Native to Crete: flowering in April. The white flowers with yellow throats stand up to  8 cm, the outer surfaces of the flowers are marked with varying degrees of purple. The branched styles are deep orange or yellow.

 Crocus sieberi subsp. atticus  - Native to the Attica region of Greece, it has lilac-blue or violet flowers with yellow throats.  The corm tunics are more coarsely netted than the other subspecies.  It is found growing in stony areas in the mountains and in woods and scrub areas usually above 1000 meters, with flowering occurring from March to June.

 Crocus sieberi subsp. sublimis - Native to the Peloponnese,  southern Albania, Macedonia, and also found in southern Bulgaria,  has pale lilac flowers with pale yellow throats. 

 Crocus sieberi subsp. nivalis - Native to the Peloponnese with lilac-blue flowers that have yellow throats.

Uses
Crocus sieberi is cultivated in gardens as an ornamental plant for its flowers. It has also been used as food; in Greece the corms are eaten raw -  with the flavor said to resemble hazelnuts. In Turkey, the leaves are eaten as greens.

Cultivars
Examples: 
'Bowles's White' (white with orange centre) 
'Firefly' (lilac)
'Hubert Edelsten' is a cross between Crocus sieberi subsp. sieberi and Crocus sieberi subsp. atticus.   (outside deep purple with broad white bands, inside pale lilac with orange center) 
'Ronald Ginns' (pale pink to white petals with dark purple feathering on the outside and a yellow throat)
'Tricolor' (gold centre, middle white band, outer rich lilac-blue edge)
'Violet Queen' (deep amethyst-violet flowers, paler within, with a rich, golden centre)
Crocus sieberi subsp. sublimis forma tricolor burtt. - from Mt. Chelmos in the northern Peloponnese. Plants are more variable than the cultivar 'Tricolor', with bright lilac flowers that have bright orange throats and a white band.   

The cultivars marked  have gained the Royal Horticultural Society's Award of Garden Merit.

References

 Jānis Rukšāns. Buried treasures: finding and growing the world's choicest bulbs, Timber Press, 2007.

External links

 The Plant Expert
 Paghat's Garden
 IPNI Listing
 Kew Plant List

sieberi
Garden plants
Flora of Greece
Plants described in 1831